The Very Best of Level 42 is a compilation released by the UK band Level 42. It features a chronological track listing of the band's hit single releases from 1981 to 1994.

Track listing
 Love Games (M.King, P.Gould) 4:14 from Level 42
 The Chinese Way  (M.King, P.Gould, W.Badarou) 4:03  from The Pursuit of Accidents
 The Sun Goes Down (Living It Up) (M.King, W.Badarou, M.Lindup, P.Gould) 3:46 from Standing in the Light
 Micro Kid  (M.King, W.Badarou, P.Gould, M.Lindup) 3:49 from Standing in the Light
 Hot Water  (M.King, W.Badarou, P.Gould, M.Lindup) 3:37 from True Colours
 The Chant Has Begun  (M.King, P.Gould) 4:19 from True Colours
 Something About You (M.King, P.Gould, R.Gould, W.Badarou, M.Lindup) 3:45 from World Machine
 Leaving Me Now  (M.King, P.Gould, W.Badarou) 3:35 from World Machine
 Lessons in Love  (M.King, R.Gould, W.Badarou) 4:02 from Running in the Family
 Running in the Family  (M.King, P.Gould, W.Badarou) 3:58 from Running in the Family
 To be With You Again  (M.King, R.Gould) 3:56 from Running in the Family
 It's Over  (M.King, W.Badarou, R.Gould) 4:41 from Running in the Family
 Children Say  (M.King, P.Gould, W.Badarou) 4:28 from Running in the Family
 Heaven in My Hands  (M.King, R.Gould) 4:08 from Staring at the Sun
 Take a Look  (M.King, R.Gould, W.Badarou, M.Lindup) 4:43 from Staring at the Sun
 Tracie  (M.King, G.Husband) 3:25 from Staring at the Sun
 Guaranteed (M.King, M.Lindup, W.Badarou, G.Husband) 3:51 from Guaranteed
 Forever Now (M.King, Musker, Darbyshire) 4:16 from Forever Now
 The Sun Goes Down (Living It Up) '98 Mix (featuring Omar) (M.King, W.Badarou, M.Lindup, P.Gould) 4:00 Previously unreleased

Personnel

Mark King - Vocals/Bass
Mike Lindup - Keyboards/Vocals
Boon Gould - Guitars (Tracks 1-13)
Phil Gould - Drums (Tracks 1-13,18)
Gary Husband - Drums (Tracks 14-17)
Alan Murphy - Guitars (Tracks 14-16)
Allan Holdsworth - Guitars (Track 17)
Dominic Miller - Guitars (Track 17)
Danny Blume - Guitars (Track 18)
Wally Badarou - Keyboards

Production

Tracks 1, 2 Produced by Mike Vernon for Handle Artists
Track 3 Produced by Larry Dunn and Verdine White
Track 4 Produced by Andy Sojka and Jerry Pike for Unbelievable Productions
Tracks 5 & 6 Produced & Engineered by Ken Scott for Komos Production
Tracks 7, 8, 9, 10, 11, 12 & 13 Produced by Wally Badarou and Level 42. Assistant producer, engineer and mixer - Julian Mendelsohn
Tracks 14, 15 & 16 Produced by Level 42, Wally Badarou and Julian Mendelsohn
Track 17 Produced by Level 42 and Wally Badarou at The Summerhouse. Mixed by Tom Lord Alge at *The Hit Factory, New York
Track 18 Produced by Mark King, Mike Lindup, Phil Gould & Steve Anderson. Engineered by Paul *Wright, assisted by Tim Pilling
Track 19 Produced by Level 42. Remix by Dodge for Soul Inside Productions. Keyboards by Jonathan Shorten. Additional vocals by Omar Lye-Fook. Engineered & recorded @ Inside Sound Studio by Dodge. Mastered by Mike Showell at Metropolis.

Certifications

References

1998 greatest hits albums
Level 42 albums